Sir Joseph West Ridgeway,  (16 May 1844 – 16 April 1930) was a British civil servant and colonial governor. He was known as "Sir West Ridgeway". He was involved in the sodomy and child molestation charges against Hector Archibald MacDonald, commander of British forces in Ceylon. Ridgeway ordered MacDonald's return to London, careful to prevent the huge scandal that was to be expected: "Some, in fact most of his victims ... are the sons of the most respected men in the colony, British as well as locals," he wrote, noting that he was able to convince the local press to hold still so "no more dirt comes to light".

Military career
Educated at St Paul's School, London, Ridgeway was commissioned into the Bengal Infantry in 1860. In 1869 he was selected for civil employment in India. In 1881 he married Carolina Ellen "Lina" Bewicke.

Colonial service
In 1884 Ridgeway was given command of the Indian section of the Afghan Boundary Commission, established by Russia and the United Kingdom to determine the northern boundary of Afghanistan. The following year he became Chief Commissioner. He was Under-Secretary for Ireland from 1887 to 1892, and Lieutenant Governor of the Isle of Man from 1893 to 1895.

He was Governor of Ceylon (now Sri Lanka) from 1896 to 1903. During that time, he was involved in bringing charges of sodomy and pederasty against Hector MacDonald, commander of the troops in Ceylon. Ridgeway advised MacDonald to return to London, his main concern being to avoid a massive scandal: "Some, indeed most, of his victims ... are the sons of the best-known men in the Colony, English and native", he wrote, noting that he had persuaded the local press to keep quiet in hopes that "no more mud" would be stirred up.

He later unsuccessfully stood twice for election to the House of Commons, in the City of London and London University constituencies.

Honours
 GCMG: Knight Grand Cross of the Order of St Michael and St George – 1 January 1900 – New Year Honours list
 LL.D. (honorary), University of Cambridge, May 1902.
 LL.D (honorary), University of Edinburgh, 26 July 1902.

A species of Asian snake, Lytorhynchus ridgewayi, is named in his honour.

References

|-

Governors of British Ceylon
Under-Secretaries for Ireland
1844 births
1930 deaths
People educated at St Paul's School, London
Knights Grand Cross of the Order of the Bath
Knights Grand Cross of the Order of St Michael and St George
Knights Commander of the Order of the Star of India
Lieutenant Governors of the Isle of Man
Members of the Privy Council of Ireland